The 1970 Polish protests occurred in northern Poland during 14–19 December 1970. The protests were sparked by a sudden increase in the prices of food and other everyday items. Strikes were put down by the Polish People's Army and the Citizen's Militia, resulting in at least 44 people killed and more than 1,000 wounded.

Background
In December 1970, the government suddenly announced major increases in the prices of basic foodstuffs, especially dairy products, after bad harvests throughout the  year. The increases proved to be a major shock to ordinary citizens, especially in the larger cities.

Events
Demonstrations against the price increases broke out in the northern Baltic coastal cities of Gdańsk, Gdynia, Elbląg, and Szczecin. The regime was concerned about an emerging wave of sabotage, which may have been inspired by the secret police, who wanted to legitimize a harsh response to the protestors. Another possible reason why the secret police would instigate sabotage and violence would be to precipitate a change in the leadership of the ruling party, by causing violent deaths among the workers and then blaming the party for them. It is known that the secret police had their agents among the striking workers (and recruited more in the aftermath). Actions of the secret police before and after the protests were codenamed akcja "Jesień '70".

Protests started on 14 December. When a party official tried to convince the strikers to return to work, addressing them using loudspeakers on a police car, the strikers took over the police car and used the loudspeakers to announce a general strike, and to call for a manifestation in front of the party building to be held the same day. Fighting against the police started in the afternoon, and widespread fighting and rioting, including arson, continued until late in the evening.

The police started rounding up workers, often random ones who did not participate in protests or rioting, and brutally beating them, commonly using a technique where the detainee was forced to move along a long row of policemen, all of them beating the detainee with their batons.

On 15 December in Gdańsk, strikers set fire (reportedly twice) to the building of the Provincial Committee of the ruling party, which became an iconic moment of the protests. They also took some policemen prisoner, transported them to the shipyard, forced them to change into the workers' work clothing, and then transported them to a police station. Fire consumed the roof of the Provincial Committee's building until the protesters were repelled by a column of twenty OT-62 military armored personnel carriers. At least six people are known to be killed on December 15 in Gdańsk. Two more were shot to death the next morning, at or near the shipyard.

In Gdynia, a neighboring city with its own shipyard, the protests were generally more peaceful than in Gdańsk - until the events of 17 December.

Vice prime minister Stanisław Kociołek, in his televised speech on the evening of 16 December, condemned the protesters but also called for the workers to get back to work. However, on the  night, the shipyard in Gdynia was surrounded by the police and the military, including tanks. Responding to the vice PM's appeal proved deadly to some of the workers. In Gdynia, the soldiers had orders to stop workers returning to work and on 17 December fired into the crowd of workers emerging from their trains; at least 11 of them were killed. Then, in other parts of Gdynia, people were shot dead while protesting, bringing the official death toll in Gdynia to 18. The number of the wounded in Gdynia is far from certain but is estimated to be in the hundreds.

The protest movement then spread to other cities, leading to strikes and occupations. The government mobilized 5,000 members of special squads of police and 27,000 soldiers equipped with heavy tanks and machine guns. Overall, more than 1,000 people were wounded and at least 44 killed, and 3,000 arrested, by modern accounts. Only six people were initially reported dead by the government. All who died were buried overnight, with only the closest relatives present or no relatives present at all, in order to avoid spreading the riots.

Resolution

The Party leadership met in Warsaw and decided that a full-scale working-class revolt was inevitable unless drastic steps were taken. With the consent of Leonid Brezhnev in Moscow, Gomułka, Kliszko, and other leaders were forced to resign: if the price rises had been a plot against Gomułka, it succeeded. Since Moscow would not accept Mieczysław Moczar, Edward Gierek was drafted as the new leader. The price increases were reversed, wage increases announced, and sweeping economic and political changes were promised. Gierek went to Gdańsk and met the workers, apologised for the mistakes of the past, promised a political renewal and said that, as a worker himself, he would now govern for the people.

Stanisław Kociołek lost the position of vice prime minister. For a short time he remained a member of the Central Committee, but in February 1971 he was reassigned to diplomatic service. That was soon after in January 1971, in a reversal of the previous policy of secrecy, government-controlled media published the list of 44 people who were killed during the protests. Kociołek is vilified in a song related to the events of December 1970, Ballada o Janku Wiśniewskim, as the person responsible for deaths of children and women. When workers were shot dead after listening to his appeal (seemingly being lured into a trap), the blame fell on him.

Impact 
Although the aims of the protesters were mostly social and economic rather than political, the riots reinvigorated the dormant political activity of Polish society. Nevertheless, the workers from the coast did not prevent the government from implementing its goal of increased food prices, which was achieved a few weeks later, after the 1971 Łódź strikes.

Polish protests elicited broad sympathy and support, both in Western Europe and the Soviet bloc. There were copycat strikes on the Kühlungsborn Pier in East Germany and in Riga; Soviet sailors on stranded Soviet ships shared their food with the citizens of Gdańsk and Szczecin, while Polish strikers shielded Soviet families in Poland from reprisals.

See also
 Jack Strong, a 2014 Polish film about Ryszard Kukliński, who was partly motivated by the massacre to spy for NATO
 Janek Wiśniewski, a fictional name given to then-unknown young victim, immortalised in Janek Wiśniewski poem and songs.
 Man of Iron, a 1981 movie by Andrzej Wajda in which the massacre plays an important role.
 Strike, a 2006 Polish-German movie about the Solidarity Movement.
  (Black Thursday. Janek Wiśniewski died ), movie 2011

References

External links

 Poland: The uprising of December 1970 (photos)

Protests
1970 protests
Anti-communism in Poland
Attacks during the New Year celebrations
Cold War rebellions
December 1970 events in Europe
Economic history of Poland
Labor disputes in Poland
Massacres in Poland
Protests in Poland
Riots and civil disorder in Poland
Urban warfare
Conflicts in 1970